Petar Zlatinov (born 13 March 1981) is a Bulgarian former footballer who played as a midfielder.

Career
In early 2000, at 18 years old, Zlatinov signed with CSKA Sofia.

On 1 April 2003, Zlatinov was loaned to Belarusian Premier League side Dinamo Minsk for a period of three months. On 23 April, he scored the only goal in a game against BATE Borisov in the Belarusian Cup to ensure Dinamo progressed to the semi-finals. He then played full 90 minutes in Dinamo's 2–0 defeat of Lokomotiv Minsk in the final on 24 May, and collected his first Belarusian Cup winners medal. In July 2003, Zlatinov moved permanently to Dinamo, winning the 2004 Belarusian Premier League title.

After success in Belarus, Zlatinov moved back to Bulgaria to play for Litex Lovech. In July 2005, he signed a 2+1 year contract. He made his league debut in a 0–2 home loss against Pirin Blagoevgrad on 6 August. His first goal for Litex came on 10 September, scoring the second in a 5–2 win over Cherno More Varna.

On 23 February 2008, Zlatinov joined Inter Baku. Media reports estimated the transfer fee to be around €165,000. He has signed a one-and-a-half-year contract. Zlatinov collected his first Azerbaijan Premier League title winner's medal at the end of the 2007–08 season. On 29 July 2008, he scored a late equalizer to secure a 1–1 home draw against Partizan Belgrade in the second qualifying round of the Champions League.

Coaching career
On 5 July 2017, Zlatinov was appointed as player-manager of Vihren Sandanski.

On 20 June 2018, Zlatinov became manager of Second League club Pirin Blagoevgrad.

Statistics

Honours

CSKA Sofia
Bulgarian Cup (1): 2002

Dinamo Minsk
 Belarusian Cup (1): 2003
 Belarusian Premier League (1): 2004

Inter Baku
 Azerbaijan Premier League (2): 2007–08, 2009–10
 CIS Cup (1): 2011

References

External links

Profile at UEFA

1981 births
Living people
People from Sandanski
Macedonian Bulgarians
Bulgarian footballers
Bulgaria under-21 international footballers
Bulgarian expatriate footballers
Expatriate footballers in Belarus
Expatriate footballers in Azerbaijan
Bulgarian expatriate sportspeople in Azerbaijan
First Professional Football League (Bulgaria) players
Second Professional Football League (Bulgaria) players
Belarusian Premier League players
Azerbaijan Premier League players
OFC Pirin Blagoevgrad players
OFC Vihren Sandanski players
PFC CSKA Sofia players
PFC Cherno More Varna players
FC Dinamo Minsk players
PFC Litex Lovech players
Shamakhi FK players
PFC Lokomotiv Mezdra players
Bulgarian football managers
OFC Vihren Sandanski managers
PFC Pirin Blagoevgrad managers
Bulgarian expatriate sportspeople in Belarus
Association football midfielders
Sportspeople from Blagoevgrad Province